is a 1987 Seinen manga series by Haruka Inui which was originally published in Play Comic. The manga was adapted into an anime OVA series. There was also a live-action version, Welcome to Ogenki Clinic. The plotline revolves around the quirky (and perpetually horny) Doctor Sawaru Ogenki and his beautiful nurse, the busty Ruko Tatase, who help patients through their problems, and the cure almost always involves sex (something Ogenki doesn't approve on too well).

Ogenki Clinic is an erotic comedy that often employed visual metaphors for the doctor's cures. Referring to sexual intercourse as a game of pinball, or illustrating a penis as an actual missile or gun are just a few examples of the manga's humorous scenes.

Manga

Japanese
Volume 1, 
Volume 2, 
Volume 3, 
Volume 4, 
Volume 5, 
Volume 6, 
Volume 7, 
Volume 8, 
Volume 9,

English
Volume 1, 
Volume 2, 
Volume 3, 
Volume 4, 
Volume 5, ISBN
Volume 6, 
Volume 7, 
Volume 8, 
Volume 9,

Anime

The anime OVA series of Ogenki Clinic was directed by Takashi Watanabe, animation by Chuo Movie and animation production by New Network and Tokyo Kids. It was first released in Japan in 1991 on three 46-minute VHS volumes by Play Comic Video. Simply titled “Vol. 1”, “Vol. 2” and “Vol. 3”, each volume contained four episodes or “cases”.

The first two volumes, dubbed in English, were released separately on 45-minute VHS tapes in America by Anime 18 as “Check Into Ogenki Clinic” and “Return To Ogenki Clinic”, then together in 1999 as a single 90-minute DVD release titled “Ogenki Clinic Adventures”.
In 2007, they would be separated again for DVD release under Central Park Media's Anime HotShots banner as "Ogenki Clinic 1" and "Ogenki Clinic 2".
Critical Mass Video has scheduled the re-release the "Ogenki Clinic Adventures" DVD for February 2, 2010.

Kitty Media released "Vol. 3" in America in 1997 on 45-minute English subtitled and dubbed VHS releases titled “Welcome to the Ogenki Clinic”. These VHS tapes were also included by Kitty Media in their VHS box sets of “The Best Of Kitty Vol. 2” in 2000, which also contained the anime OVAs Slight Fever Syndrome and Balthus- Tia's Radiance. 
(The DVD release of “The Best Of Kitty Vol. 2” does not contain "Welcome to Ogenki Clinic", nor Slight Fever Syndrome, which were replaced by the anime OVAs Wake Up! Aria and The Legend Of Reyon).

In 1988, Mototsugu Watanabe made a live-action produced by Nikkatsu.

See also
The Joy of Sex

References

External links
 

1987 manga
1991 anime OVAs
Akita Shoten manga
Anime 18
Hentai anime and manga
Kitty Media
Seinen manga